Siershahn is an Ortsgemeinde – a community belonging to a Verbandsgemeinde – in the Westerwaldkreis in Rhineland-Palatinate, Germany.

History
Clay finds from La Tène times have been unearthed here. In 1211, Siershahn had its first documentary mention as Sigarshagen.

Politics

The municipal council is made up of 21 council members, with the extraofficial mayor (Bürgermeister), who were elected in a municipal election on 7 June 2009.

Allocation of seats in the municipal council:

Economy and infrastructure
Siershahn's biggest firm, and the one richest in tradition is Cera Tech (formerly Keramchemie), still employing most of the villagers. Nearby, during the Second World War, was a prison camp.

Siershahn has several bypass roads so that heavy vehicles do not drive through the community as they once did.

Transport
The nearest Autobahn interchange is Mogendorf on the A 3 (Cologne–Frankfurt), some 2 km away. Siershahn was once an important railway hub between Limburg, Gießen and Cologne. All passenger services were closed over the years, except for the line to Limburg. The line to Au is used for freight and it is sometimes used for tourist services. The nearest InterCityExpress stop is Montabaur station on the Cologne-Frankfurt high-speed rail line.

References

Municipalities in Rhineland-Palatinate
Westerwaldkreis